Ann-Marie Howell is an English children's author who writes historical mystery novels.

Biography

Howell lived in Nottinghamshire before studying at the University of Manchester, where she completed a BA in geography and an MA in Town Planning. She joined West Suffolk Council, writing local government policy documents. She moved to Bury St Edmunds in 2001 and took the Curtis Brown Creative Writing for Children Course in 2015.

Writing

Howell initially wrote contemporary teen fiction, but it was not until she moved to historical fiction that her first novel, The Garden Of Lost Secrets, was published by Usborne in 2019. It was followed by The House of One Hundred Clocks (2020), The Mystery of the Night Watchers (2021), and The Secret of the Treasure Keepers (2022).

Published works

References

External links
 

21st-century English women writers
English children's writers
Living people
People from Nottinghamshire
Year of birth missing (living people)